Whitfield County is a county located in the northwestern part of the U.S. state of Georgia. As of the 2020 census shows a population of 102,864. The county seat is Dalton. The county was created on December 30, 1851, and named after George Whitefield, Methodist evangelist. The "e" was omitted to reflect the pronunciation of his name.

Whitfield County is part of the Dalton, Georgia Metropolitan Statistical Area, which is also included in the Chattanooga-Cleveland-Dalton, TN-GA-AL Combined Statistical Area.

Geography
The majority of Whitfield County is located in the Conasauga River sub-basin in the ACT River Basin (Coosa-Tallapoosa River Basin), with a part of the western edge of the county is located in the Middle Tennessee-Chickamauga sub-basin of the Middle Tennessee-Hiwassee basin. A very small portion of the southern edge of the county is located in the Oostanaula River sub-basin in the larger ACT River Basin.

Adjacent counties
 Bradley County, Tennessee (north)
 Murray County (east)
 Gordon County (south)
 Walker County (west-southwest)
 Catoosa County (west-northwest)
 Hamilton County, Tennessee (northwest)

National protected area
 Chattahoochee National Forest (part)

Transportation

Major highways

  Interstate 75
  U.S. Route 41
  U.S. Route 76
  State Route 2
  State Route 3
  State Route 3 Connector
  State Route 52
  State Route 71
  State Route 201
  State Route 286
  State Route 401 (unsigned designation for I-75)

Pedestrians and cycling

 Pinhoti Trail

Demographics

2000 census
As of the 2000 Census, there were 29,385 households, out of which 36.80% had children under the age of 18 living with them, 59.50% were married couples living together, 10.80% had a female householder with no husband present, and 24.60% were non-families. 20.60% of all households were made up of individuals, and 8.20% had someone living alone who was 65 years of age or older.  The average household size was 2.82 and the average family size was 3.24.

In the county, the population was spread out, with 27.30% under the age of 18, 10.00% from 18 to 24, 30.80% from 25 to 44, 21.50% from 45 to 64, and 10.30% who were 65 years of age or older. The median age was 33 years. For every 100 females, there were 101.30 males. For every 100 females age 18 and over, there were 98.90 males.

The median income for a household in the county was $39,377, and the median income for a family was $44,652. Males had a median income of $30,122 versus $23,709 for females. The per capita income for the county was $18,515. About 8.60% of families and 11.50% of the population were below the poverty line, including 12.70% of those under age 18 and 11.70% of those age 65 or over.

2010 census
As of the 2010 United States Census, there were 102,599 people, 35,180 households, and 26,090 families residing in the county. The racial makeup of the county was 76.6% white, 3.7% black or African American, 1.3% Asian, 0.6% American Indian, 0.1% Pacific islander, 15.0% from other races, and 2.6% from two or more races. Those of Hispanic or Latino origin made up 31.6% of the population. In terms of ancestry, 12.1% were American, 11.0% were Irish, 8.4% were English, and 7.5% were German.

Of the 35,180 households, 41.4% had children under the age of 18 living with them, 54.4% were married couples living together, 13.4% had a female householder with no husband present, 25.8% were non-families, and 21.4% of all households were made up of individuals. The average household size was 2.89 and the average family size was 3.36. The median age was 34.0 years.

The median income for a household in the county was $42,345 and the median income for a family was $48,991. Males had a median income of $34,150 versus $27,315 for females. The per capita income for the county was $19,780. About 15.6% of families and 19.2% of the population were below the poverty line, including 26.7% of those under age 18 and 13.8% of those age 65 or over.

2020 census

As of the 2020 United States census, there were 102,864 people, 34,518 households, and 25,351 families residing in the county.

Education

Whitfield County Schools

High schools
 Northwest Whitfield High School
 Southeast Whitfield High School
 Coahulla Creek High School

Middle schools
 Eastbrook Middle School
 New Hope Middle School
 North Whitfield Middle School
 Valley Point Middle School
 Westside Middle School

Elementary schools

 Antioch Elementary School
 Beaverdale Elementary School
 Cedar Ridge Elementary School
 Cohutta Elementary School
 Dawnville Elementary School
 Dug Gap Elementary School
 Eastside Elementary School
 New Hope Elementary School
 Pleasant Grove Elementary School
 Tunnel Hill Elementary School
 Valley Point Elementary School
 Varnell Elementary School
 Westside Elementary School

Alternative schools
 Crossroads Academy
 Phoenix High School

Dalton Public Schools

High schools 
 Dalton High School
 Morris Innovative High School

Middle schools 
 Dalton Middle School

Elementary schools 
 Brookwood Elementary
 Blue Ridge Elementary
 City Park Elementary
 Park Creek Elementary
 Roan Elementary
 Westwood Elementary

Private schools
 Cedar Valley Christian Academy
 Christian Heritage School
 Learning Tree School

Communities

Cities
 Dalton
 Varnell

Towns
 Cohutta
 Tunnel Hill

Unincorporated community
 Rocky Face
 Dawnville
 Tilton

Politics

Like much of the rest of Georgia, Whitfield County was strongly Democratic in the early 20th century, albeit less so than other parts of the state; it went Republican for William Howard Taft in 1908, Warren G. Harding in 1920 and for Herbert Hoover in 1928. The three Republicans would lose Georgia but win their respective national elections.

Despite being strongly Democratic through Franklin D. Roosevelt's four elections and in the subsequent two, the county only narrowly went for Democrat Adlai Stevenson II in 1956 and flipped Republican for Richard Nixon in 1960. It would flip back to the Democrats and Lyndon B. Johnson in 1964, even as Barry Goldwater would become the first Republican to ever carry the state of Georgia in a presidential election. However, it would be one of the last hurrahs for the Democratic Party in Whitfield County; Hubert Humphrey would finish third here in 1968 behind Richard Nixon and third party candidate George Wallace, and it would give Nixon over 80% of the vote in 1972. It snapped back Democratic for native Georgian Jimmy Carter in 1976 and 1980, but this would be the final time it voted Democratic at the presidential level. It has become a safely Republican area throughout the remainder of the 20th century and into the 21st. In 2020, Democrat Joe Biden received over 10,000 votes, the first time a Democrat had received that many from Whitfield County since 1976, and was only one of two counties in non-metro Atlanta northwest Georgia where Donald Trump received less than 70% of the vote.

See also

 National Register of Historic Places listings in Whitfield County, Georgia
List of counties in Georgia

References

External links
  Whitfield County Genealogy & History
 Dalton City Schools District Website
 Whitfield County Schools District Website

 
1851 establishments in Georgia (U.S. state)
Counties of Appalachia
Dalton metropolitan area, Georgia
Georgia (U.S. state) counties
Northwest Georgia (U.S.)
Populated places established in 1851